"Work Hard, Play Harder" is a song co-written and recorded by American country music artist Gretchen Wilson.  It was released in October 2009 as the lead-off single from her album, I Got Your Country Right Here, which was released on March 30, 2010. Additionally, "Work Hard, Play Harder" serves as the first single release from Wilson's own Redneck Records. Wilson co-wrote the song with John Rich and Vicky McGehee (a team responsible for writing her 2005 hit "All Jacked Up"), and additional credit is given to Black Crowes members Chris and Rich Robinson.

Content
"Work Hard, Play Harder" is an up-tempo song, backed primarily by electric guitar and fiddle. The song's narrator describes having a busy work schedule, but highlights that on Friday she has free time to go out and party. The song serves as the debut single for Wilson's Redneck Records label, following her departure from Columbia Nashville.

In July 2008, the song was featured in a commercial for Saving Grace. The Black Crowes believed that "Work Hard, Play Harder" copied their song "Jealous Again"; therefore, they filed a lawsuit against Wilson. The lawsuit also covered then-label Columbia Nashville, her publishing company, and TNT. The lawsuit was eventually settled out of court for an undisclosed sum  and Black Crowes members Chris and Rich Robinson were given songwriting credits.

Critical reception
The song has received mixed reception among music critics. Juli Thanki of Engine 145 gave the song a thumbs down, noted that while "it is catchy, and far from horrible," the song was too similar in theme to several of Wilson's previous singles. Matt Bjorke of Roughstock positively described the song as "the perfect kind of song to play while driving to and from work or getting ready to go out on the weekend." He also thought that it would re-capture Wilson's fanbase. Leeann Ward of Country Universe gave the song a B− rating, describing its theme and production as an "inferior carbon copy" of her debut single "Redneck Woman." She felt that although Wilson is a "decidedly talented artist," she should be free to make better music now on her own record label.

Music video
The music video for the song, directed by Deaton-Flanigen Productions, premiered on CMT on October 13, 2009. In the video, Wilson is shown driving through the countryside, standing beside a barn with a projector screen showing footage of her previous music videos, The Saving Grace version of the video features scenes from the show on the projector screen instead of her music videos and performing with her band in the evening at an outdoor concert.

Chart performance
The song debuted at number 56 on the U.S. Billboard Hot Country Songs chart for the week of November 14, 2009; it is Wilson's first chart single since "Don't Do Me No Good" in 2008. After 33 weeks on the Hot Country Songs chart, the song reached a peak of number 18 for the week of June 26, 2010, becoming Wilson's first Top 20 single since "All Jacked Up" reached number 8 in 2005.

References

2009 singles
Gretchen Wilson songs
Songs written by John Rich
Songs written by Gretchen Wilson
Song recordings produced by Blake Chancey
Music videos directed by Deaton-Flanigen Productions
Songs written by Vicky McGehee
2009 songs